Waverly is the name of some places in the U.S. state of New York:
Waverly, Tioga County, New York, a village in New York's Southern Tier
Waverly, Franklin County, New York, a town in Northern New York
Waverly, Cattaraugus County, New York, a hamlet in Western New York